Orobanchaceae, the broomrapes, is a family of mostly parasitic plants of the order Lamiales, with about 90 genera and more than 2000 species. Many of these genera (e.g., Pedicularis, Rhinanthus, Striga) were formerly included in the family Scrophulariaceae sensu lato. With its new circumscription, Orobanchaceae forms a distinct, monophyletic family. From a phylogenetic perspective, it is defined as the largest crown clade containing Orobanche major and relatives, but neither Paulownia tomentosa nor Phryma leptostachya nor Mazus japonicus.

The Orobanchaceae are annual herbs or perennial herbs or shrubs, and most (all except Lindenbergia, Rehmannia and Triaenophora) are parasitic on the roots of other plants—either holoparasitic or hemiparasitic (fully or partly parasitic). The holoparasitic species lack chlorophyll and therefore cannot perform photosynthesis.

Description

Orobanchaceae is the largest of the 20–28 dicot families that express parasitism. Apart from a few non-parasitic taxa, the family displays all types of plant parasitism: facultative parasite, obligate parasite, hemiparasites, and holoparasites.

Roots and stems 
Parasitic plants are attached to their host by means of haustoria, which transfer nutrients from the host to the parasite. Only the hemiparasitic species possess an additional extensive root system referred to as the lateral or side haustoria. In most holoparasitic species there is a swollen mass of short, bulky roots or one big swollen haustorial organ, which may be simple or composite, commonly called the terminal or primary haustorium.

Plants are reduced to short vegetative stems, their alternate leaves are reduced to fleshy, tooth-like scales, and have multicellular hairs interspersed with glandular hairs.

The hemiparasitic species (transferred from Scrophulariaceae) with green leaves are capable of photosynthesis, and may be either facultative or obligate parasites.

Flowers 
The hermaphroditic flowers are bilaterally symmetrical and grow either in racemes or spikes or singly at the apex of the slender stem. The tubular calyx is formed by 2–5 united sepals. There are five united, bilabiate petals forming the corolla and they may be yellowish, brownish, purplish, or white. The upper lip is two-lobed, the lower lip is three-lobed. There are two long and two short stamens on slender filaments, inserted below the middle, or at the base of the corolla tube, alternating with the lobes of the tube. A fifth stamen is either sterile or lacking completely. The anthers dehisce via longitudinal slits. The pistil is one-celled. The ovary is superior. The flowers are pollinated by insects or birds (e.g. hummingbirds, as in Castilleja).

Fruits 
The fruit is a dehiscent, non-fleshy, 1-locular capsule with many very minute endospermic seeds. Fruits of Orobanchaceae are small and abundant and can produce between 10,000–1,000,000 seeds per plant. These are dispersed by the wind over long distances, which increases their chances of finding a new host.

Taxonomy

Evolution 
Development of the haustoria was a significant evolutionary event that allowed for the advancement of parasitic plants. The holoparasitic clade, Orobanche, delineates the first transition from hemiparasitism to holoparasitism within Orobanchaceae.

Despite the similar morphological traits found in both Scrophulariaceae and Orobanchaceae, the latter is now morphologically and molecularly considered monophyletic, though many of its genera were once considered a part of the family Scrophulariaceae.

Lindenbergia, once treated as a member of the Scrophulariaceae, is the one of the only autotrophic genera within Orobanchaceae. It is believed to be the sister group to the hemiparasitic genera within its family.

Genomics 
The parasitism and its different modes have been suggested to have an impact on genome evolution, with increased DNA substitution rates in parasitic organisms compared to non-parasitic taxa. For example, holoparasite taxa of Orobanchaceae exhibit faster molecular evolutionary rates than confamilial hemiparasites in three plastid genes.

In a study comparing the rates of molecular evolution of parasitic versus non parasitic taxa for 12 pairs of angiosperm families — including Apodanthaceae, Cytinaceae, Rafflesiaceae, Cynomoriaceae, Krameriaceae, Mitrastemonaceae, Boraginaceae, Orobanchaceae, Convolvulaceae, Lauraceae, Hydnoraceae, and Santalaceae/Olacaceae —, parasitic taxa evolve on average faster than their close relatives for mitochondrial, plastid, and nuclear genome sequences. Whereas Orobanchaceae fit to this trend for plastid DNA, they appear to evolve slower than their non parasitic counterpart in comparisons involving nuclear and mitochondrial DNA.

Genera 
Orobanchaceae comprises the following genera, listed according to their life history trait.

 Bartsiella
 Bornmuellerantha
 Brachystigma
 Brandisia
 Cyclocheilon
 Kopsiopsis
 Macrosyringion
 Odontiella

Non-parasitic 
 Lindenbergia
 Rehmannia 
 Triaenophora

Hemiparasitic 

 Agalinis
 Alectra
 Asepalum
 Aureolaria
 Bartsia
 Bellardia
 Buchnera
 Bungea
 Buttonia
 Castilleja : Indian paintbrush
 Centranthera
 Chloropyron
 Cordylanthus : Bird's-beak
 Cycnium
 Cymbaria
 Dasistoma
 Dicranostegia
 Escobedia
 Esterhazya
 Euphrasia
 Gerardiina
 Ghikaea
 Graderia
 Hedbergia
 Lamourouxia
 Leptorhabdos
 Leucosalpa
 Macranthera
 Magdalenaea
 Melampyrum
 Melasma
 Micrargeria
 Micrargeriella
 Monochasma
 Nesogenes
 Nothobartsia
 Nothochilus
 Odontites
 Omphalotrix
 Orthocarpus
 Parastriga
 Parentucellia
 Pedicularis
 Petitmenginia
 Phtheirospermum
 Physocalyx
 Pseudobartsia
 Pseudomelasma
 Pseudosopubia
 Pseudostriga
 Pterygiella
 Radamaea
 Rhamphicarpa
 Rhaphispermum
 Rhinanthus
 Rhynchocorys
 Schwalbea
 Seymeria
 Seymeriopsis
 Sieversandreas
 Silviella
 Siphonostegia
 Sopubia
 Spirostegia
 Striga
 Tetraspidium
 Thunbergianthus
 Tozzia
 Triphysaria
 Vellosiella
 Xizangia
 Xylocalyx

Holoparasitic 

 Aeginetia
 Boschniakia : Groundcone
 Christisonia
 Cistanche:  Desert broomrape
 Conopholis : Cancer-root
 Epifagus : Beechdrops
 Eremitilla
 Gleadovia
 Harveya
 Hyobanche
 Lathraea
 Mannagettaea
 Orobanche : Broomrape
 Phacellanthus
 Phelypaea
 Platypholis
 Tienmuia

Distribution 
The family Orobanchaceae has a cosmopolitan distribution, found mainly in temperate Eurasia, North America, South America, parts of Australia, New Zealand, and tropical Africa. The only exception to its distribution is Antarctica, though some genera may be found in subarctic regions.

Ecology 
This family has tremendous economic importance because of the damage to crops caused by some species in the genera Orobanche and Striga. They often parasitize cereal crops like sugarcane, maize, millet, sorghum, and other major agricultural crops like cowpea, sunflower, hemp, tomatoes, and legumes. Because of the ubiquitous nature of these particular parasites in developing countries, it is estimated to affect the livelihood of over 100 million people, killing 20 to 100 percent of crops depending on infestation.

Some genera, especially Cistanche and Conopholis, are threatened by human activity, including habitat destruction and over-harvesting of both the plants and their hosts.

Research for this plant family can often be difficult due to its permit requirements for collection, travel, and research.

Notes

References

External links 
 Wiki of Orobanchaceae
Parasitic Plant Connection: Orobanchaceae

 
Lamiales families